The 1970 KFK competitions in Ukraine were part of the 1970 Soviet KFK competitions that were conducted in the Soviet Union. It was 7th season of the KFK in Ukraine since its introduction in 1964.

First stage

Group 1
 Kolos Buchach
 Sokil Lviv
 Khimik Kalush
 Kooperator Berehovo
 Tsementnyk Mykolaiv
 Voskhod Chernivtsi
 Enerhiya Khmelnytskyi
 Budivelnyk Khust

Group 2

Group 3

Group 4

Group 5

Final

Promotion
None of KFK teams were promoted to the 1971 Soviet Second League, Zone 1.
 none

However, to the Class B were promoted following teams that did not participate in the KFK competitions:
 none

References

Ukrainian Football Amateur League seasons
4
Soviet
Soviet
football